Alientrap Games Inc. (commonly referred to as just Alientrap) is an independent video game developer led by Lee Vermeulen and Jesse McGibney. It has released the games Nexuiz, Capsized, Apotheon, Cryptark, and Wytchwood.

Games developed
 Nexuiz – Windows, Mac OS X, Linux (2005)
 Capsized – Windows, Mac OS X, Linux, XBLA (2011)
 Autocraft – Windows (2014)
 Apotheon – Windows, PlayStation 4 (2015)
 Maximum Override – Windows (2016)
 Cryptark – Windows, PlayStation 4 (2016)
 Modbox – Windows (HTC Vive, Oculus Rift, MagicLeap) (2016)
 Wytchwood - Windows, PlayStation 4, PlayStation 5, Nintendo Switch, Xbox One (2021)
 Gunhead - TBA

Nexuiz 

Alientrap was founded in 2002 by Lee Vermeulen to develop Nexuiz, a first-person shooter built on Quake engine derivative DarkPlaces.

During the development of Nexuiz, the Alientrap team consisted of head designer Vermeulen, DarkPlaces engine programmer Ashley Hale, programmer Andreas "Black" Kirsch, and a variety of contributing artists and level designers. It was released as free software under the GPL in 2005. Nexuiz was later remade as a commercial product in 2012, published by THQ.

Capsized 

Alientrap re-formed in 2009 under Lee Vermeulen to create a new game, Capsized, in collaboration with Jesse McGibney. Vermeulen started the project as a computer science student at the University of Saskatchewan bringing on McGibney, a longtime friend then studying illustration at Sheridan College. Vermeulen served as programmer and McGibney as art designer, while sound design was handled by freelancers.

Both Vermeulen and McGibney submitted an early version of Capsized as their final undergraduate assignment, and continued development full-time after graduation as Alientrap Games Inc.. Capsized was released in April 2011 on Steam and is in development for iOS and Android platforms.

Apotheon 

In mid-2011, Alientrap began work on Apotheon, an action role-playing metroidvania game set in ancient Greece. Art designer Jesse McGibney drew inspiration from the painting style of ancient Greek pottery. Alientrap director Lee Vermeulen compared the free-roaming level design of Apotheon to that of the classic action-adventure game Castlevania: Symphony of the Night. Apotheon was released on February 3, 2015, for Linux, OS X, Microsoft Windows, and PlayStation 4.

Cryptark 

On June 20, 2017, Alientrap released Cryptark on Steam and the PS4 store. It is a side-scrolling 2d roguelike that tasks players with boarding and fighting inside large alien spaceships so they can be salvaged.

Modbox 
On April 5, 2016, Alientrap released Modbox on Steam Early Access. It is a virtual reality multiplayer Game Creation System initially released for HTC Vive and Oculus Rift. It won a Technical Achievement award at the 2016 Vision Summit, and Best Educational Game at the 2016 Canadian Video Game Awards. A MagicLeap version was released in 2020.

Wytchwood 

Wytchwood is a crafting adventure game set in a land of gothic fables and fairytales. Released on December 9th 2021 on Windows, PlayStation 4, PlayStation 5, Nintendo Switch, Xbox One

References

External links 
 

Video game development companies
Video game companies of Canada